FC Progress Biysk was a Russian football team from Biysk. It played professionally in 1966–1970 and in 1988–1992. The best result it achieved was 13th place in the Zone 6 of the Russian Second Division in 1992.

External links
  Team history at KLISF

Association football clubs established in 1966
Association football clubs disestablished in 1993
Defunct football clubs in Russia
Sport in Altai Krai
1966 establishments in Russia
1993 disestablishments in Russia